Martin Schaefer (born October 18, 1989) is a Brazilian rugby sevens player. He was selected for 's sevens squad for the 2016 Summer Olympics.

References

External links 
 

1989 births
Living people
Male rugby sevens players
Brazilian rugby union players
Olympic rugby sevens players of Brazil
Brazil international rugby sevens players
Rugby sevens players at the 2016 Summer Olympics
Brazilian rugby sevens players
Sportspeople from São Paulo
Brazil international rugby union players